Helmi Hasan (born 29 November 1979) is an Indonesian politician from the National Mandate Party who is the mayor of the city of Bengkulu.

Early life
Hasan was born in Lampung on 1979 as the youngest of six children, and he went to high school in East Jakarta. He studied economics at the University of Bengkulu, during which he was involved in the Muslim Students' Association, and he joined the National Mandate Party (PAN).

Career
By 2004, Hasan had been elected to Bengkulu's City Council. Within PAN, he became the secretary of the provincial office by 2005, and its chairman by 2010. He was further elected into Bengkulu's provincial DPRD following the 2009 legislative election. At the provincial body, he was a deputy speaker.

In 2012, Hasan ran for Bengkulu's mayoral election with the support of PAN, Golkar, Gerindra, PNBK and Demokrat. He was elected mayor after defeating the incumbent mayor Ahmad Kanedi by winning 75,058 (51.46%) votes. He was sworn into office on 21 January the following year. He was made a suspect of graft, but his suspect status was dismissed by a court decision in 2015.

Hasan secured reelection following the 2018 local elections and was sworn in for a second term on 24 September 2018. Between January and September, the post was held by Budiman Ismaun as an ad interim mayor. He ran in the 2020 gubernatorial elections for Bengkulu, but lost to incumbent Rohidin Mersyah.

Family
Hasan is married to Khairunnisa Helmi and the couple has four children. His elder brother Zulkifli Hasan is also a politician who served as the Speaker of the People's Consultative Assembly between 2014 and 2019, with two other of his siblings holding political offices in Lampung.

References

1979 births
Living people
Mayors and regents of places in Bengkulu
People from Bengkulu
National Mandate Party politicians
Members of Indonesian city councils
Members of Indonesian provincial assemblies
People from Lampung
Lampung people
Mayors of places in Indonesia